John Mark Tillmann (24 February 1961 – 23 December 2018) was a Canadian art thief and white supremacist who for over two decades stole over 10,000 antiques and art objects from museums, galleries, archives and antique shops mainly in Atlantic Canada.

Tillman had an extensive criminal record for obscene telephone calls, shoplifting, threats and assaults, but his antique thefts eluded authorities for years. He was eventually arrested with stolen property in January 2013, leading to a theft investigation by the Royal Canadian Mounted Police (RCMP) with assistance from Interpol, the Royal Newfoundland Constabulary, the United States Department of Homeland Security and the Federal Bureau of Investigation (FBI).

Seizing over 3,000 artifacts from his home in the first week, police finally closed the file nearly three years later when returning over 10,000 exhibits to their respective owners, which included a 250-year-old George Washington spy letter valued at about a million dollars. A few weeks following the sensational bust, police ran out of room within their own storage facilities to house the enormous amount of artifacts which were being uncovered. A special climate controlled and secretly located warehouse was then rented out by authorities to store Tillmann's looted artwork for the next three years.
One of several private historical experts brought in by police to assist in the investigation remarked to the Toronto Star newspaper: ″It was incredible...to lay it all out would have taken an airplane hangar. It's an unbelievable collection of materials.″

The eclectic collection of items included a film prop suit of armour, a 7000-year-old Native American stone gouge, oil paintings and watercolors, tapestries, rare books, sculptures, rare documents and a trove of other ancient and old miscellaneous items. Tillmann was sentenced to nine years in prison by a Canadian Court on September 25, 2013, and the court seized over two million dollars of his assets under the proceeds of crime legislation. Tillmann was released on parole in November 2015, after serving just slightly over two years of his sentence.

Early life and political involvement
Born in Halifax, Nova Scotia in the 1960s, Tillmann grew up in the  Halifax suburb of Fall River. He was a major political organizer for the Reform Party in the 1990s and was campaign manager for their party candidate in the federal riding of Halifax-West during the tumultuous Canadian election of 1993. At the time, Tillmann made national headlines for stating controversial views while strongly avowing White Nationalism. As a university graduate majoring in international marketing and getting an MBA, he travelled to Russia in the late 1990s and lived in the Izmaylovo District of north-east Moscow for several years. While there, he owned and operated street kiosks and learned to speak Russian. In Moscow, he met his wife Oxana Kuzina. He also had relationship with her sister.

Art thefts
Kuzina became a collaborator in Tillmann's heists along with her brother Vladimir. It is reported that he and his Russian wife would sometimes even take time out to have sex during some of their more risky heists. His team were regarded as criminal specialists, with Kuzina acting as a distraction, her brother Vladimir being an expert in computer hacking and alarms disabling, with Tillmann being the mastermind and main organizer of the countless heists they performed.  Tillmann's sister in an interview said, "The guy is a genius, that's the way he's always been ever since he was a child." In November 2001, Tillmann incorporated a Canadian company called Prussia Import & Export Inc, which authorities believe he used to launder money that he and his wife earned from transactions in black market stolen artwork.

Referred to as one of the most successful thieves in Canadian history, The Toronto Standard made comparisons of his real life capers to that of famous Hollywood heist film, Ocean's Eleven. However most of his solo thefts were antique stores and museums in Atlantic Canada where he used charm to gain trust and occasionally pretended to be maintenance staff. His theft ranged from rare books and documents that he could sell, to minor and low-value items.

Two special prosecutors were tasked with handling the huge and complex legal case, with one of them remarking of Tillmann; "He was clearly intelligent enough to amass a false empire over years...and it's a shame ultimately for him and for society that he didn't use that to different ends."

One theft from a Canadian institution included a hundred and fifty year old first edition copy of Charles Darwin's book, On the Origin of Species. Valued at several hundred thousand dollars, the book was eventually tracked down by the FBI and U.S. Department of Homeland Security and was returned to the Canadian government in a special ceremony at the Canadian Consulate in New York City in October 2015. John F. Prato, consul general of Canada in New York, praised RCMP and Homeland Security officers for their professionalism and co-operation throughout the Tillmann case. He remarked at the ceremony; "No two countries in the world have the relationship Canada and the U.S. have and today we honour two incredible law enforcement groups that worked hard and in partnership to recover this essential piece of history."

In popular culture
The Canadian television program The Fifth Estate aired a documentary on Tillmann in April 2016. There is talk in some circles of a movie being produced about his story. Referred to as a Canadian antiques smuggler by The Wall Street Journal, lead police investigator for the case was quoted as saying; "Stealing was how he got his thrills. He was a master of manipulation and I'm sure there will be movies made about this one day." He also referred to Tillmann as being smart, well dressed, very cocky and that his saga of theft and deception was truly remarkable. A museum and artifact shop owner in Eastern Canada who knew Tillmann personally for over 15 years, commented on his distinctive style: "He was sophisticated, wore designer labels. I called him Mr. GQ."

Life after prison
Tillmann signed a book and movie deal with Nimbus, a Canadian publishing company with the book scheduled for release in September 2018. However, in 2019 CTV News announced that Nimbus would not be publishing the book, likely due to Tilmann's neo-Nazi views.

Police and others have speculated that Tillman may have been able to successfully stash away large amounts of cash and artwork that has never been recovered. He was flagged on worldwide museum security bulletins and was listed on the official website of the United States Department of Homeland Security.

He died on December 23, 2018. The cause of his death was not reported.

References

1961 births
2018 deaths
20th-century Canadian criminals
Art thieves
Canadian male criminals
Criminal duos
Document theft
People convicted of book theft
People from Halifax, Nova Scotia